Sylvi Graham (born 17 December 1951) is a Norwegian politician for the Conservative Party.

From 2004 to 2005, during the second cabinet Bondevik, Graham was appointed State Secretary of the Ministry of Foreign Affairs. She served as a deputy representative to the Norwegian Parliament from Akershus during the term 2005–2009. From 2017 she is President of the Forum for Women and Development.

On the local level Graham was the mayor of Oppegård from 1995 to 2004, and since 2005. She was first elected to Oppegård municipal council in 1980.

References

1951 births
Living people
Deputy members of the Storting
Conservative Party (Norway) politicians
Mayors of places in Akershus
Norwegian state secretaries
People from Oppegård
Women mayors of places in Norway
20th-century Norwegian women politicians
20th-century Norwegian politicians
21st-century Norwegian politicians
21st-century Norwegian women politicians
Women members of the Storting
Norwegian women state secretaries